Lohkva is a settlement in Luunja Parish, Tartu County in eastern Estonia.

Poet Karl Eduard Sööt (1862–1950) was born in Lohkva.

Gallery

References

Villages in Tartu County